Big beat is an electronic music genre.

Big beat may also refer to:

 Big beat, in the 1950s, later to be known as beat music
 Big-beat (Eastern Bloc), a name for rock and roll and relative genres in Central Europe in 1960s
 Big Beat (film), a 1993 Czech musical comedy film
 Big Beat (album), by Sparks, 1976
 Big Beat Records (British record label), specializing in garage rock
 Big Beat Records (American record label), specializing in electronic and dance music
 Big Beat from Badsville, an album by the Cramps, 1997

See also
The Big Beat (disambiguation)